"Banana" is a song by Brazilian singer Anitta featuring American singer Becky G. It was released through Warner Music Brasil on April 5, 2019, as the third single from Anitta's album Kisses (2019). It is Anitta and Gomez's second collaboration, following their feats on the remix of "Mala Mía" with Maluma released in 2018.

Music video
The music video was released alongside the song on April 5. It was directed by Lula Carvalho.

Live performances
Anitta and Becky G performed "Banana" together for the first time at the 2019 Billboard Latin Music Awards on April 25, 2019.

Charts

Certifications

References

2019 singles
2019 songs
Anitta (singer) songs
Becky G songs
Warner Records singles